Amends is the third studio album by American rock band Grey Daze composed of Chester Bennington's vocals from the 1990s over newly recorded instrumentals. "What's in the Eye" was released as the first single from the project on January 17, 2020, and was co-produced by Chris Traynor, Kyle Hoffman and Jay Baumgardner. The second single, "Sickness", featuring Page Hamilton and produced by Pete Nappi, was released on February 6. The release of the album was postponed from April 10 to June 26 due to the COVID-19 outbreak.

Background
Tentatively titled "New Sun Tomorrow", the project was started in February 2017. The album was announced in June by bassist Mace Bayers as a remaster of "...No Sun Today" and they would be working on with Sylvia Massy. The band had previously tried to release a remastered version of the album through Artemis Records in 2003 but conflicts with lawyers within Linkin Park's label Warner Bros. Records prohibited the release.

The original versions of "Wake Me" and "...No Sun Today" were also available on iTunes up to 2005 before they were removed. Linkin Park's discography arrived to the digital store in 2006.
The news about the album came with the announcement of a Grey Daze reunion show at the Marquee Theatre in Tempe, AZ. According to Dowell, it was Bennington's idea to put the band together for a Club Tattoo 20th anniversary party and they had started getting offers to play at festivals all over the world.

Jason Barnes, who played guitar on "Wake Me", was announced as part of the band's line-up for the show and was seen recording in the studio. He was responsible for finding the original masters of the band's debut album. They had just started to strip the masters down and re-track the guitars when the project was put on hold following Bennington's sudden death on July 20.
Members of Grey Daze and Dead by Sunrise/Julien-K teamed up for a special acoustic performance on September 2 at the Saxe Theater in Las Vegas  in honor of Bennington. "The Down Syndrome" and two Dead by Sunrise songs were performed with Ryan Shuck on vocals.

Writing and recording
Grey Daze was given permission by Bennington's widow, Talinda, to continue working on the project granted that they didn't change Chester's voice. In late December, Massy confirmed the sessions would be resumed. According to her, the music would be modernized for the current market using master tapes recorded in the late nineties. However, the band did not move forward with her and Jason Barnes was absent from the project after 2017. The band reached out to former Warner Bros. Records executive Tom Whalley to release the album through his Loma Vista Recordings music label.

Dowdell said, "We reverse engineered a lot of the music. We took all the music away, we kept the vocal track and the lyrics that was there – that was all Chester. We kept the integrity and the intention of all of the vocals, intact from its original inception. We actually rewrote all of the music to every single song from the ground up." They worked on Bennington's vocals for two months before working on the music. Writing the instrumentals took about a year and half and recording took almost another year and a half. Besides Bennington's original vocals from "Wake Me" and "...No Sun Today" , previously unreleased alternate takes were also used on the songs.

They worked at Salt Mine Studios and NRG Recording Studios with several musician friends of Bennington or artists that he loved which included Ryan Shuck (Julien-K), Marcos Curiel (P.O.D.), Jaime Bennington (Chester's son), Chris Traynor (Bush), Brian "Head" Welch and James "Munky" Shaffer (Korn), LP (Laura Pergolizzi), Carston Dowdell and Brennen Brochard (Sean's sons), Heidi Gadd, Carah Faye (Shiny Toy Guns), Jasen Rauch (Breaking Benjamin, Love and Death, ex-Red) and Pete Nappi (Ocean Park Standoff). They also had Esjay Jones and Lucas D'Angelo (Betraying the Martyrs) in the production team.

On June 9, 2019, Grey Daze confirmed they had wrapped up the project and by August they had mixed the album. Draven Bennington was also asked to sing on the album but declined because it was difficult for him to listen to his father's voice at the time.

Track listing

Note
 Tracks 9, 10, 11 appeared on "Wake Me"
 Tracks 1, 4, 5, 6, 7, 8  appeared on "...No Sun Today"
 Tracks 2 and 3 appeared on both "Wake Me" and "...No Sun Today"

Credits

 A&R – Rene Mata, Ryan Whalley, Tom Whalley
 Art Direction – Mike Lythgoe
 Artwork – Cristin Davis, Mace Beyers, Sean Dowdell
 Vocals – Chester Bennington 
 Bass – Mace Beyers
 Guitar - Cristin Davis
 Drums - Sean Dowdell (Backup Vocals)
 Additional Vocals – Carah Faye (track 4), Jaime Bennington (track 8), Laura Pergolizzi (track 11)
 Additional Drums – Brennen Brochard (track 7), Carston Dowdell (track 4)
 Additional Guitar – Brian Welch (tracks 7, 10), Chris Taynor (tracks 2, 3, 6, 8), James Shaffer (track 7), Jasen Rauch (track 10), Marcos Curiel (track 3), Page Hamilton (track 1), Ryan Shuck (track 5)
 Piano – Jean-Yves D'Angelo (tracks 8, 9) 
 Keyboards – Jamie Muhoberac (tracks 2, 6) 
 Strings – Heidi Gadd (tracks 8, 9)
 Drum Programming – Daniel Pampuri
 Coordinator – Diana Ciobotea
 Engineer – Adam Schoeller, Andrea Roberts, Andy Kipnes (track 7), Tenni Gharakhanian (track 7)
 Executive-Producer – Jay Baumgardner, Rene Mata
 Co-producer – Grey Daze
 Legal – Jeff Worob
 Photography By – Jim Louvau, Kerry Rose, Mark Silverstein, Mike Walliser, Rene Mata, SAKIphotography, Sean Hartgrove, Tom Preston
 Additional Producers – Alex Aldi (track 7), Cass Dillon (track 11), Chris Traynor (tracks 2, 3, 6), Esjay Jones (tracks 4, 6, 8, 9, 10), Kyle Hoffmann (tracks 2, 3), Lucas D'Angelo (tracks 4, 6, 8, 9, 10), Lucio Rubino (track 5), Pete Nappi (track 1)
 Mastered By – Ted Jensen
 Mixed By – Jay Baumgardner
 Recorded By – Kyle Hoffmann
 Technician – John Nicholson, Mark Daughney
 Lyrics By – Chester Bennington, Sean Dowdell

Charts

Reception

References

2020 albums
Loma Vista Recordings albums